Harry Eugene Wheeler (March 3, 1858 – October 9, 1900) was an American 19th century Major League Baseball player from Versailles, Indiana. A well travelled player, he played for eight different teams in three different leagues during his six seasons.

Career
Wheeler began his career with the Providence Grays as a pitcher, where he pitched well. He had an earned run average of 3.48, and won six of the seven games in which he pitched. A good start to his career, but the next two years, he played in only six games for the Cincinnati Reds, Cincinnati Stars and Cleveland Blues. Harry did well with the bat that season, finishing in the top ten in many hitting categories, highest among them were his 11 triples, in which he finished third.

He played for the Columbus Buckeyes the following season. The  season saw his hitting decline, and his fielding, which was already a liability, was getting worse. This was his last full season he played.

Post-career
Wheeler died at the age of 42, of syphilitic locomotor ataxia. He was interred at Spring Grove Cemetery in Cincinnati.

See also
List of Major League Baseball player–managers

References

External links

19th-century baseball players
Baseball players from Indiana
Providence Grays players
Cincinnati Reds (1876–1879) players
Cleveland Blues (NL) players
Cincinnati Red Stockings (AA) players
Columbus Buckeyes players
St. Louis Browns players
Kansas City Cowboys (UA) players
Kansas City Cowboys (UA) managers
Chicago Browns/Pittsburgh Stogies players
Baltimore Monumentals players
Burials at Spring Grove Cemetery
Sportspeople from Ohio
1858 births
1900 deaths
Waterbury (minor league baseball) players
Waterbury Brassmen players
Waterbury Brass Citys players
Manchester Maroons players
Worcester Grays players
Major League Baseball player-managers
People from Versailles, Indiana